El vuelo de la victoria (English: The Flight to Victory) is a Mexican telenovela produced by Nathalie Lartilleux for Televisa. The telenovela follows the story of Victoria a young runner who finds in athletics a way to make sense of her life and will fight to get a place in the Olympics. It stars Paulina Goto, Mané de la Parra and Andrés Palacios.

Plot summary 
This story begins twenty-two years ago, when Cecilia, a young woman from a wealthy family, becomes pregnant. She is forced to abandon her daughter, by orders of her parents. After several days, Cecilia leaves her baby at the doors of an hacienda, thinking that her daughter will have a solved future.

However, it is not the owners of the hacienda who find Victoria, it is Chencha, the employee. She names the girl Victoria, thinking that her life will be full of victories, and raises her as her daughter. From an early age, Victoria has it clear that, although poor, she is meant to be a runner, and the love of the bold is never lacking, like the love of Andres, the son of the Santibáñez family, owners of the hacienda where Victoria lives.

Victoria begins a bitter period of her life after she is unjustly imprisoned at the age of fourteen in the local reformatory. Upon becoming a young adult, she is taken to prison. This was because of Gloria Santibáñez, mother of Andrés, who hates her. During these years, Victoria's only motivation was listening to Raúl de la Peña's radio program every night, which always has the most inspiring words and the best advice, in the midst of her sordid and dark reality.

In the meantime, Andrés has two goals. The first is to achieve Victoria's freedom, for which he studies law and graduates with honors. After this, he tries to achieve his second goal, and it is to gain Victoria's love.

Victoria is carried away by her feelings and marries Andres, but very soon realizes that she feels trapped again, because Gloria makes her life impossible. At that moment, she follows the beat of her heart and goes to Mexico City to pursue her dream, which is to become a professional athlete.

In the capital, Victoria meets Raul de la Peña, whom she had admired since she listened to his radio program in jail. Besides dedicating himself to the locution, Raúl is a doctor of the Olympic Committee, and it is right there that Victoria gets to work in the pursuit of her greatest desire. Raúl loves Victoria since he met her, and wants to take care of and protect her. Raúl is the same with Elsa, his daughter, who is actually his niece, but he loves her as if he were her father, because his brother gave her to him at a young age.

Andrés understands too late that Victoria is not a woman to have tied to an hacienda, since she has already lost many years of freedom. Andrés annuls their marriage after being taken over with jealousy and Victoria has the opportunity to make her life with Raul, who gives her his unconditional love and allows her to pursue her dreams. Victoria dedicates her entire soul to achieve her dream and finally arrives at the Olympics, where she obtains the highest merit for her country. However, her heart is puzzled, because she will have to decide if she returns with Andres or chooses to be happy with Raúl.

Cast

Starring 
 Paulina Goto as Victoria
 Andrés Palacios as Raúl de la Peña
 Mané de la Parra as Andrés Santibáñez

Also starring 
 Jorge Aravena as Jorge
 Elizabeth Álvarez as Magdalena
 René Strickler as Clemente
 Susana Dosamantes as Gloria de Santibáñez
 Jorge Poza as Julio
 Verónika con K as Chencha
 Natalia Guerrero as Cecilia
Helena Rojo as Maria Isabel

Recurring
 Juan Pablo Gil as Arturo
 Eva Cedeño as Cristina
 Gaby Mellado as Adriana
 Tania Lizardo as Usumacinta
 Isadora González as Mireya
 Rafael Amador as Padre Esteban
 Lizetta Romo
 Ana Lorena Elorduy as Elsa de la Peña
 Daniel Martinez as Emiliano
 Clarisa González as Elena Santibáñez
 Briggitte Bozzo as Ángela
 Lalo Palacios as Elías
 Guillermo Avilán
 Andres B. Durán
 Pía Sanz as Luz Clarita
 Susana González as Isadora
 Arturo Peniche as Braulio

Production

Development 
In February 2017, it was announced that the telenovela had been approved to begin writing, in development with Televisa. Production officially began on May 2, 2017. The series is written by Carlos Romero and produced by Nathalie Lartilleux.

Casting 
Paulina Goto was cast as Victoria on March 3, 2017. followed by Mané de la Parra as Andrés, and Andrés Palacios as Raúl De la Peña. Pablo Montero had been chosen initially to interpret the character of Palacios, but due to problems with the production, he was dismissed from the project. Susana Dosamantes also had problems with the production so her participation was cut and is set to appear in a few episodes.

Rating

Episodes

References

External links 
 

Mexican telenovelas
Televisa telenovelas
2017 Mexican television series debuts
2017 telenovelas
2017 Mexican television series endings
Mexican television series based on Venezuelan television series
Spanish-language telenovelas